is a 1995 Japan-exclusive soccer simulation video game, which was developed and published by Konami for the PlayStation. It's an official J-League licensed game.

Gameplay

The intro of the game features a Soccer Stadium floating in the sky, then a footballer that performs a free kick.

There are six modes available from the main menu: Exhibition, Master Championship, Hyper Cup, All Stars Exhibition, Options Mode and Player Mode.
In the option Mode you can set the time limit, the ground conditions, the CPU level, and the sound options.

In the "Player Mode" are shown players photos and statistics, this mode features a background female Japanese voiced music.

The graphic is fully 3D rendered. The button configuration is the following: shoot, pass, cross, run, tackle; you can substitute players by pressing the Start button.

When a player scores a goal, a replay with a close-up camera angle is shown. The game HUD features portraits of the players at the bottom of the screen. The audio during a match features background music, crowd sound effects and ingame Japanese commentary.

See also
List of J.League licensed video games

References

1995 video games
Japan-exclusive video games
J.League licensed video games
Pro Evolution Soccer
PlayStation (console) games
PlayStation (console)-only games
Video games developed in Japan
Video games set in Japan
Multiplayer and single-player video games